3 Hardman Street is a 16-storey high-rise building in Spinningfields, Manchester, England. At , as of 2023 it is the third-tallest building in the Spinningfields area (after 1 Spinningfields and the Manchester Civil Justice Centre) and the joint 36th-tallest building in Greater Manchester.

Background
3 Hardman Street was designed by architects Sheppard Robson, as part of the Allied London project regenerating Spinningfields into a major business centre. According to Allied London chief executive Mike Ingall, "3 Hardman Street has been designed in particular for the financial and professional services sector for Manchester".

The building was completed in February 2009, and it was the largest speculatively developed office outside London at the time. (A speculative development is construction with no formal commitment from tenants). The building was 80% let before completion. The building has a BREEAM rating of excellent. The building is 16-storeys tall with one floor used as a plant floor. The building also has two underground levels which hold 250 parking spaces.

In 2010, Allied London sold the building for £183.5 million. It was bought by Glenn Arrow UK Property, which is owned by the Luxembourg-based company, Ærium. Allied London continues to manage the building.

Tenants
Beachcroft
RSM UK
The Bank of New York Mellon
Barclays
BDO Stoy Hayward
Brown, Shipley & Co.
Equinox Financial Search and Selection
General Medical Council
Investec
Kukinto
Marks and Spencer
Pinsent Masons
PKF
Pure Gym
Regus
Robert Walters plc
Shoosmiths

References

External links
3HardmanStreet.com
 Capital Properties (UK) Ltd - property management

Skyscrapers in Manchester
Glass architecture
Office buildings completed in 2009
Office buildings in Manchester